Christopher or Chris Hughes may refer to:

 Chris Hughes (born 1983), American internet entrepreneur; co-founder of Facebook
 Christopher Hughes (diplomat) (1786–1849), American attorney and diplomat
 Christopher Hughes (quiz contestant) (born 1947), British quiz champion
 Christopher Hughes II, a character on the American television soap opera As the World Turns
 Chris Hughes, member of the band Beep Beep
 Chris Hughes (hypnotist) (born 1975), British hypnotist, hypnotherapist, speaker and entertainer
 Chris Hughes (footballer), English football midfielder
 Chris Hughes (journalist), UK tabloid journalist and author
 Chris Hughes (musician) (born 1954), British musician and record producer; former drummer for the band Adam and the Ants
 Chris Hughes (model), British model and television personality
 Christopher Hughes, chairman of the National DNA Database Ethics Group